The Piano Sonata No. 1 in C minor, Op. 4 was written by Frédéric Chopin in 1828 (probably begun around July).  It was written during Chopin's time as a student with Józef Elsner, to whom the sonata is dedicated. Despite having a low opus number, the sonata was not published until 1851 by Tobias Haslinger in Vienna, two years after Chopin's death. This sonata is considered to be less refined than the later 2 sonatas, and is thus much less frequently performed and recorded.

Structure 
The sonata has four movements:

References

External links 

 

Piano sonatas by Frédéric Chopin
1828 compositions
Compositions in C minor
Compositions by Frédéric Chopin published posthumously
Music with dedications